Daniel Ricardo Febles Argüelles (born 8 February 1991) is a Venezuelan footballer who plays for Mohammedan Sporting Club as a forward. He is the son of the former Venezuelan player Pedro Febles.

References

External links 

1991 births
Living people
Footballers from Caracas
Venezuelan footballers
Venezuelan expatriate footballers
Association football forwards
Caracas FC players
Aragua FC players
Atlético Venezuela C.F. players
Deportivo Táchira F.C. players
Monagas S.C. players
Seoul E-Land FC players
Guabirá players
Carabobo F.C. players
Venezuelan Primera División players
K League 2 players
Bolivian Primera División players
Expatriate footballers in South Korea
Venezuelan expatriate sportspeople in South Korea
Expatriate footballers in Bolivia
Venezuelan expatriate sportspeople in Bolivia
Mohammedan SC (Dhaka) players
Bangladesh Football Premier League players